The  is a  Japanese book about laws and customs. The major part of the writing was completed in 927.

History
In 905, Emperor Daigo ordered the compilation of the Engishiki.  Although previous attempts at codification are known to have taken place, neither the Konin nor the Jogan Gishiki  survive making the Engishiki important for early Japanese historical and religious studies.

Fujiwara no Tokihira began the task, but work stalled when he died four years later in 909. His brother Fujiwara no Tadahira continued the work in 912 eventually completing it in 927. 

After a number of revisions, the work was used as a basis for reform starting in 967.

Contents

The text is 50 volumes in lengths and is organized by department:
volumes 1–10: Department of Worship: In addition to regulating ceremonials including Daijyō-sai (the first Niiname-sai following the accession of a new emperor) and worship at Ise Grand Shrine and Saikū, this section of the Engishiki recorded liturgical texts, listed all 2,861 Shinto shrines existing at the time, and listed the 3,131 officially-recognized and enshrined Kami.  Felicia Gressitt Bock published a two-volume annotated English language translation with an introduction entitled Engi-shiki; procedures of the Engi Era in 1970.
volumes 11–40: Department of State and Eight Ministries
volumes 41–49: Other departments
volume 50: Miscellaneous laws

See also
 Japanese Historical Text Initiative

References

Further reading

External links
Japanese text and English translation at the Japanese Historical Text Initiative
Manuscript scans, Waseda University Library: volumes 1-50 and 8-10

Government of Japan
10th century in Japan
Law of Japan
Society of Japan
Late Old Japanese texts
Law books
Legal history of Japan
Shinto texts
10th century in law
10th-century Japanese books
927